La Ciudad is a Hohokam people archaeological site in Phoenix, Arizona, excavated by Frank Midvale 1929–1936. It is covered today by St. Luke's Medical Center. Much of the archaeological material in the Heards' collection at the Heard Museum came from the La Ciudad Indian ruin, which the Heards purchased in 1926 at 19th and Polk streets.

See also
 Mesa Grande
 Hohokam Pima National Monument, in Coolidge, Arizona, which contains artifacts from Snaketown
 Casa Grande Ruins National Monument, with Hohokam structures of the Pueblo III and Pueblo IV Eras
 Indian Mesa Ruins
 Pueblo Grande Ruin and Irrigation Sites
 Lake Pleasant Regional Park

References

Hohokam
Phoenix, Arizona
Archaeology of the United States